Canyon Creek is a  tributary of the Salt River in central Arizona.

References

Rivers of Arizona
Tributaries of the Salt River (Arizona)
Rivers of Gila County, Arizona